Zen Mountain Monastery (or, Doshinji, meaning Temple of the Way of Reality) is a Zen Buddhist monastery and training center on a  forested property in the Catskill Mountains in Mount Tremper, New York. It was founded in 1980 by John Daido Loori originally as the Zen Arts Center. It combines the Rinzai and Sōtō Zen traditions, in both of which Loori received Dharma transmission. Loori's first dharma heir was Bonnie Myotai Treace, Sensei, who received shiho, or dharma transmission, from him in 1996. From Loori's death in October 2009 until January 2015, Zen Mountain Monastery had two teachers: Geoffrey Shugen Arnold and Konrad Ryushin Marchaj, who received Dharma transmission from Loori in 1997 and 2009, respectively. Since January 2015, the training at the Monastery has been led by Shugen Roshi, assisted by Ron Hogen Green, Sensei; Jody Hojin Kimmel, Sensei; and Vanessa Zuisei Goddard, Sensei (currently on leave).

Retreat center building
The monastery was originally built as Camp Wapanachki in the 1930s.  The massive Arts and Crafts style stone and wood frame former retreat house and chapel was built in two phases between about 1935 and 1938.  The four story "main house" is the earliest section. It contains living spaces, libraries, a small cellar and a large kitchen.  The later section is built of bluestone and contains a dining hall and chapel.

It was listed on the National Register of Historic Places in 1994.

Training
Students and residents of the monastery practice according to Daido Roshi's Eight Gates of Zen training matrix. These gates consist of zazen, face-to-face teaching, liturgy, moral and ethical teachings, work practice, body practice, art practice and academic study. Their practice occurs either at home for lay students or at the monastery during weekend retreats and monthly week-long sesshin (meditation intensives). The monastery's schedule includes a Sunday morning program open to the general public and a variety of weekend and week-long Zen training programs, focusing variously on painting, poetry, shakuhachi performance, Japanese archery (kyūdō), qigong, and many other activities.

The monastery grounds are also home to the Zen Environmental Studies Institute and Dharma Communications, which runs The Monastery Store and publishes Mountain Record: The Zen Practitioner's Journal and other print, audio, video and online information resources.

In addition to supporting the lay community, ZMM is home to a number of monastic practitioners. These individuals have taken life vows of simplicity, selflessness, stability, service and accomplishing the Buddha's Way. As a result, they do not work outside the monastery, earn money, or have children.  As the Mountain Record states: "Monastics in the order are entirely dependent on the sangha while maintaining the Monastery for current practitioners and sustaining it for generations to come."

Mountains and Rivers Order
ZMM is the main house of the Mountains and Rivers Order, an umbrella organization inspired by the teachings of Dogen as found in the Mountains and Rivers Sutra. Founded by John Daido Loori in 1980, it includes the following branches:
 Dharma Communications is a nonprofit, right livelihood training dojo run at the monastery, and supplies teacher's talks and sitting supplies to home dwelling practitioners. It also creates the Mountain Record the longest running Zen journal published in the USA.
 Society of Mountains and Rivers is composed of affiliate sitting groups in Buffalo, Albany, Philadelphia, Vermont and New Zealand, which hold weekly sitting sessions and visits from the teachers of the Order.
 National Buddhist Archives which collects and digitizes outstanding documents and media chronicling the history of Buddhism in America thus far, and especially the history of Zen Mountain Monastery.
 The Zen Environmental Studies Institute sponsors and conducts wilderness retreats, environmental mindfulness workshops, and pursues research on the local environment.
 National Buddhist Prison Sangha provides teaching supplies and sitting opportunities to inmates currently serving in a correctional facility.
 Fire Lotus Temple, is the only residential Zen training facility in New York City, offering training opportunities to lay practitioners on a daily basis, along with Saturday retreats and a Sunday program similar to that held at ZMM.

Gallery

See also

Timeline of Zen Buddhism in the United States

References

External links

Mountains and Rivers Order of Zen Buddhism
PBS Special featuring ZMM teachers and residents
New York Times review
Video of Annual Community Dana Dinner
Chronogram article on National Buddhist Prison Sangha

Buddhist monasteries in the United States
Zen centers in New York (state)
Buddhist temples in New York (state)
White Plum Asanga
Zen Buddhist monasteries
National Register of Historic Places in Ulster County, New York
Religious buildings and structures completed in 1935
Religious buildings and structures in Ulster County, New York